The Goya Award for Best Cinematography (Spanish: Premio Goya a la mejor fotografía) is one of the Goya Awards, Spain's principal national film awards. The category has been presented ever since the first edition of the Goya Awards. Teodoro Escamilla was the first winner of the award for his work in Love, the Magician (1986). 

José Luis Alcaine holds the record of most nominations for this category with twenty, winning five of them. Javier Aguirresarobe is the most awarded in this category with six wins, for Prince of Shadows (1991), The Dog in the Manger (1996), The Others (2001), Soldiers of Salamina  (2003) and The Sea Inside (2004). Guillermo Navarro also won the Academy Award for Best Cinematography for his work on Pan's Labyrinth.

In the list below the winner of the award for each year is shown first, followed by the other nominees.

Winners and nominees

1980s

1990s

2000s

2010s

2020s

References

External links
Official site

Cinematography
Awards for best cinematography